Mariano Cappi González (born October 15, 1991 in Montevideo), commonly known as Mariano Cappi, is a Uruguayan footballer who plays as a defender for El Tanque Sisley.

References 

1991 births
Living people
Footballers from Montevideo
Uruguayan footballers
Association football defenders
Central Español players
Portimonense S.C. players
C.A. Rentistas players
Uruguayan expatriate footballers
Expatriate footballers in the Dominican Republic